Statistics of J. League Cup, officially the 2000 J.League Yamazaki Nabisco Cup, in the 2000 season.

Overview
It was contested by 27 teams, and Kashima Antlers won the cup.
There were 22 teams played the first round, with 5 teams getting byes to the second round.

Results

1st round
Montedio Yamagata 0–3 ; 1–0 Sanfrecce Hiroshima
Omiya Ardija 0–4 ; 0–2 Vissel Kobe
Kawasaki Frontale 3–0 ; 1–2 Urawa Red Diamonds
Shonan Bellmare 2–3 ; 0–0 Avispa Fukuoka
Ventforet Kofu 0–2 ; 1–5 Yokohama F. Marinos
Albirex Niigata 0–1 ; 1–3 Kyoto Purple Sanga
Cerezo Osaka 2–0 ; 1–0 Vegalta Sendai
Sagan Tosu 0–1 ; 1–2 Verdy Kawasaki
Oita Trinita 2–2 ; 1–3 JEF United Ichihara
Gamba Osaka 2–1 ; 1–0 Consadole Sapporo
Shimizu S-Pulse 4–1 ; 3–1 Mito HollyHock

2nd round
Yokohama F. Marinos 4–1 ; 0–1 Sanfrecce Hiroshima
Kawasaki Frontale 1–0 ; 1–1 Kashiwa Reysol
Verdy Kawasaki 1–0 ; 1–0 Cerezo Osaka
Kyoto Purple Sanga 1–1 ; 0–1 FC Tokyo
Gamba Osaka 0–1 ; 2–1 Jubilo Iwata
Avispa Fukuoka 1–1 ; 2–3 Kashima Antlers
JEF United Ichihara 1–1 ; 1–2 Nagoya Grampus Eight
Vissel Kobe 2–0 ; 0–4 Shimizu S-Pulse

Quarterfinals
Verdy Kawasaki 0–0 ; 0–2 Kawasaki Frontale
Jubilo Iwata 1–1 ; 1–2 Kyoto Purple Sanga
Yokohama F. Marinos 1–2 ; 1–1 Kashima Antlers
Shimizu S-Pulse 4–6 ; 0–0 Nagoya Grampus Eight

Semifinals
Kyoto Purple Sanga 0–2 ; 2–1 Kawasaki Frontale
Nagoya Grampus Eight 1–3 ; 2–3 Kashima Antlers

Final

Kashima Antlers 2–0 Kawasaki Frontale
Kashima Antlers won the cup.

References
rsssf
 J. League

J.League Cup
Lea